Zamba (Dzamba) is a Bantu language spoken in the Democratic Republic of the Congo. Once considered a dialect of Bangi, Nurse (2003) places it closer to Lingala Instead Of Bangi.

References

Bangi-Ntomba languages